Ats is an Estonian-language male given name.

People named Ats include:
 Ats Amon (1916–1944), Estonian basketball player
 Ats Purje (born 1985), Estonian footballer

References

Estonian masculine given names